Daniel Mark Pudi (born March 10, 1979) is an American comedian and actor. His roles include Abed Nadir on the NBC sitcom Community (2009–2015), for which he received three nominations for the Critics' Choice Television Award for Best Supporting Actor in a Comedy Series and one nomination for the TCA Award for Individual Achievement in Comedy. Since 2020 he has starred as Brad Bakshi in the Apple TV+ comedy series Mythic Quest. He was the voice of Huey Duck on the 2017 reboot of DuckTales.

Early life
Daniel Mark Pudi was born in Chicago on March 10, 1979, the son of programmer and analyst Teresa (née Komendant) and Abraham L. Pudi (1955–2018). His parents immigrated to the U.S. and became naturalized citizens: his mother came from the village of Pokośno, Poland, and his father came from the village of Poduru, India, and was from a Telugu Christian family. Pudi grew up speaking Polish with his mother and grandmother.

He grew up on the South Side of Chicago with brother Adam and sister Katherine but attended Notre Dame College Prep in Niles, a northern suburb. In 2013, he gave the commencement address at Notre Dame College Prep.

Pudi studied dance in Chicago and attended Marquette University in Milwaukee, Wisconsin, graduating with a degree in communication and theatre in 2001. At Marquette, he was the first winner of the Chris Farley Scholarship. Beyond paying for a year of school, the scholarship led to him performing at an improv comedy event featuring Jim Breuer and Dave Chappelle, increasing his interest in studying improv. After Marquette, he performed in summer stock theatre in Wisconsin, studied at The Second City in Chicago., and joined Stir Friday Night!, a sketch comedy ensemble of Asian-American performers. Other SFN alumni include Steven Yeun.

Career
Pudi became a recruiter for an executive search firm before moving to Los Angeles in 2005 to seek television and film roles. His job, whereby he was a remote worker, permitted him to attend auditions, helping him avoid the "struggling actor thing in terms of waiting tables, temping and so on". He performed in several television pilots before joining the cast of Community, which he starred in for six seasons from 2009 to 2015.

He has appeared in multiple television advertisements for such products as Snickers, Verizon, McDonald's, T-Mobile, Pokémon, and Far Cry 4. In 2012, he appeared as a celebrity contestant on GSN's version of The Pyramid with fellow Community cast member Yvette Nicole Brown.

In film, he portrayed Arash in the comedy film Road Trip: Beer Pong, and starred in the comedy horror film Knights of Badassdom, which was one of the highlights of Comic Con 2011, according to HitFix.com. He starred in the Jones Street Station music video for "The Understanding". He has made cameo appearances in many internet videos, including BriTANicK's "A Monologue for Three". Pudi had a cameo appearance in Captain America: The Winter Soldier, and the live episode of Hot in Cleveland, as well as a cameo in Star Trek Beyond.

In the autumn of 2014, Pudi appeared in the off-Broadway musical FOUND. He played the lead role in The Tiger Hunter, an independent film directed by Lena Khan in 2016 and funded through a Kickstarter campaign. In 2017, Pudi began voicing Huey Duck in the DuckTales reboot. He also appeared as Teddy on the NBC sitcom Powerless in the same year.

Pudi plays Brad Bakshi in the TV series Mythic Quest: Raven's Banquet, which premiered in February 2020. His theater performance for En Garde Arts' series Uncommon Voices was made public in August 2020. The work in progress, entitled Running, tackles his attempt to piece together his relationship with his father, which affected his personal identity, cultural background, and his experience with racism throughout his personal life and career.

He reunited with Community co-star Alison Brie in the 2022 film Somebody I Used to Know, written by Brie.

Personal life
Pudi is married to Bridget Showalter. They met while attending Marquette University in their freshman year. Their twins, a son and a daughter, were born in January 2012. Pudi is also a runner and has completed several marathons.

Pudi bought a house in Pasadena, California, in 2014.

Filmography

Film

Television

Video games

References

External links

1979 births
Living people
American male actors of Indian descent
American male comedians
American male film actors
American male television actors
American male voice actors
American male writers
American people of Polish descent
Indian people of Polish descent
Male actors from Chicago
Marquette University alumni
21st-century American male actors